Langley was an American racing car constructor. Langley cars competed in one FIA World Championship race - the 1950 Indianapolis 500.

World Championship Indianapolis 500 results

Formula One constructors (Indianapolis only)
American racecar constructors

References